Liberty Grove is a suburb in the Inner West of Sydney, in the state of New South Wales, Australia. 

Liberty Grove is located 17 kilometres west of the Sydney central business district, in the local government area of the City of Canada Bay.

More specifically, Liberty Grove is located between Homebush Bay Drive to the west and the Main Northern Line railway to the east. It is surrounded by the suburbs of Rhodes to the north and Concord West to the east and south, and it shares the same postcode of 2138.

The Liberty Grove development  won the 1999 Urban Development Institute of Australia award for excellence.

History 
Settlers first arrived in the area in January 1793 and began farming on 'Liberty Plains'. Through the 20th century it became one of Sydney's industrial areas. However, it and much of adjacent industrial area around Homebush Bay, were completely transformed as part of the Olympic precinct development in preparation for the 2000 Sydney Olympics.

Amenities
The Liberty Grove complex contains swimming pools, tennis courts, basketball court, gymnasium, village green and parks, function room and entrances to Rhodes and Concord West.  Rhodes Waterside shopping centre is 100m from the northern entrance.

Transport 
Vehicle access to Liberty Grove is available from Homebush Bay Drive and Oulton Ave.

The northern (vehicle) entrance is a ten-minute walk to Rhodes railway station and the southern (pedestrian) entrance is a ten-minute walk to Concord West railway station and Bicentennial Park.

Settlers Boulevard, Liberty Grove is accessible from the east by bicycle and foot from an underpass on Queen St Concord West between Castlestead Street and Coonong Road.  It is also accessible in the north by bicycle and foot from Rhodes and Concord West at Oulton Avenue.  From the south it may be accessed by cyclists and pedestrians at Concord Avenue off King Street, which leads to Concord West, North Strathfield and Olympic Park.

References

 http://www.libertygrove.net.au/about-liberty-grove

Suburbs of Sydney
City of Canada Bay